Charles Alan Siebert (March 9, 1938 – May 1, 2022) was an American actor and television director. As an actor, he is best known for his role as Dr. Stanley Riverside II on the television series Trapper John, M.D., a role he portrayed from 1979 to 1986, and for his numerous appearances on the $25,000 Pyramid. After 1986, although he continued working as an actor, Siebert's career was focused on working as a director for episodic television for such shows as Xena: Warrior Princess, and Hercules: The Legendary Journeys.

Early life and education
Siebert was born in Kenosha, Wisconsin. He studied acting at Marquette University and the London Academy of Music and Dramatic Art (LAMDA).

Career 
He began his career appearing in regional theatre productions throughout the United States during the 1960s with such companies as Shakespeare in the Park in New York City, the Lincoln Center Repertory Company, the American Shakespeare Festival in Stratford, Connecticut, the Guthrie Theater, the McCarter Theatre in Princeton,  Chicago's Goodman Theatre, and Baltimore's Center Stage. He spent seven summers at the Williamstown Theatre Festival and was a charter member of the American Conservatory Theater.

He made his Broadway debut in 1967 in Bertolt Brecht's Life of Galileo followed by the role of Michael Leon in John Sebastian and Murray Schisgal's 1968 musical Jimmy Shine with Dustin Hoffman in the title role. Subsequent Broadway appearances included Neil Simon's The Gingerbread Lady, with Maureen Stapleton, David Storey's The Changing Room, David Rabe's Sticks and Bones, and the 1974 revival of Tennessee Williams' Cat on a Hot Tin Roof starring Elizabeth Ashley, Fred Gwynne, and Keir Dullea. Notable Off-Broadway appearances include Colette starring Zoe Caldwell, and Rubbers directed by Alan Arkin.

Siebert began appearing regularly on New York television during the late 1960s and early 1970s, mostly in soap operas like Another World, As the World Turns, Search for Tomorrow, The Nurses, and One Life to Live. Moving to Los Angeles in 1976 Siebert made his first feature film appearance in the horror cult classic Blue Sunshine. He then began appearing as a guest artist on numerous television programs such as One Day at a Time, The Blue Knight, The Rockford Files,Murder She Wroteand Mancuso, F.B.I. starring Robert Loggia. Also, he was a regular on the comedy program Husbands, Wives & Lovers. In 1987, he was cast alongside Hayley Mills as her husband on the NBC pilot Good Morning, Miss Bliss; however, NBC passed on the program and it was then picked up by the Disney Channel, which made numerous casting changes including dropping Siebert's role. The program would evolve into the Saturday morning hit Saved by the Bell. Film roles throughout the mid to late 1970s included ...And Justice for All with Al Pacino, Michael Crichton's Coma, All Night Long with Barbra Streisand and Gene Hackman, and White Water Summer with Sean Astin and Kevin Bacon.

In 1979 Siebert was cast in his most important role to date, Dr. Stanley Riverside II, on Trapper John, M.D. where he also began his directing career. He played a major supporting role as the mayor of Los Angeles, Frank Baldwin, in the 1990 television miniseries The Big One: The Great Los Angeles Earthquake, a disaster thriller. Siebert was a regular on game shows in the 80s, appearing on incarnations of Pyramid, Match Game, Super Password, and Blackout.

His directing career, which began with seven episodes of Trapper John, M.D., eventually resulted in numerous episodes of Xena, Warrior Princess, Hercules: The Legendary Journeys, Silk Stalkings, Renegade, Pacific Blue, and Vanishing Son, as well as episodes of Knots Landing, The Pretender, Lifestories, Palace Guard and Jack's Place.

Death
Siebert died on May 1, 2022, aged 84, at UCSF Medical Center in San Francisco from COVID-19-related pneumonia.

Filmography

Film

Television

References

External links
 
 
 
  Charles Siebert: An Appreciation

1938 births
2022 deaths
Male actors from Wisconsin
American male stage actors
American male film actors
American male television actors
American television directors
Actors from Kenosha, Wisconsin
Deaths from the COVID-19 pandemic in California